Parting Glances is a 1986 American drama film. The film was one of the earlier motion pictures to deal frankly and realistically with the subject of AIDS and the impact of the relatively new disease on the gay community in the Ronald Reagan era and at the height of the pandemic. It is considered by film critics an important film in the history of gay cinema. The story revolves around a gay couple facing the challenges of a long-distance relationship. The film was well-received for its detailed evocation of gay and gay-friendly urbanites in 1980s Manhattan.  

The film's soundtrack includes the Bronski Beat songs "Love and Money," "Smalltown Boy" and "Why." First-time director Bill Sherwood died of complications due to AIDS in 1990.

Plot
Robert and Michael, a gay male couple in their late 20s, live in New York City. Robert is leaving for two years on a work assignment in Africa while his partner, Michael, stays behind. Michael's ex-boyfriend, Nick, for whom Michael cooks, looks after and still loves, has AIDS.

Over the next twenty-four hours, the story shifts between scenes taking place at a farewell party for Robert hosted by the couple's artist friend, Joan, and a dinner party hosted by Robert's employer, Cecil, and his wife, Betty, who have an unconventional marriage.

Cast

Reviews and recognition
Parting Glances gave Steve Buscemi his first major movie role. "It is to both his and the film's credit that the anguish of AIDS is presented as part of a larger social fabric, understood in context, and never in a maudlin light," said Janet Maslin in her New York Times review. Time Out London wrote “Sherwood brings a notable grace and droll humour to his story of two male lovers parting against the backdrop of a friend dying of the Big A.”

Preservation and restoration
In 2006, Outfest and the UCLA Film and Television Archive announced that the film would be the first to be restored as a part of the Outfest Legacy Project.

On July 16, 2007, as a part of the Outfest Legacy Project, a restored print of Parting Glances received its world premiere at the Directors Guild of America in Los Angeles. The four major stars of the film, Richard Ganoung, John Bolger, Steve Buscemi, and Kathy Kinney, were in attendance and participated in a panel discussion after the viewing.

The restoration print received its New York City premiere on October 29, 2007 at the Lincoln Center for the Performing Arts.

See also
 List of lesbian, gay, bisexual or transgender-related films

References

External links

1986 films
1986 LGBT-related films
1986 independent films
1986 drama films
1986 comedy-drama films
American LGBT-related films
American comedy-drama films
Films about parties
Films set in Manhattan
Films shot in New York City
Gay-related films
HIV/AIDS in American films
1986 directorial debut films
1986 comedy films
1980s English-language films
1980s American films